Tyus is a given name and surname.  Notable people with the name include:

Surname
 Alex Tyus (born 1988), American-Israeli professional basketball player, also plays for the Israeli national basketball team
 Tina Tyus-Shaw, American television news anchor and journalist
 Wyomia Tyus, American athlete

Given name
 Tyus Battle, American basketball player
 Tyus Bowser, American football player
 Tyus Edney, American basketball coach and former player
 Tyus Jackson, American football linebacker
 Tyus Jones, American basketball player
 Tevin Tyus, The Entrepreneur King, CEO of TEK Clothing

Place
 Tyus, Perm Krai, a locality in Russia
 Tyus, Georgia, a community in the United States

References